Salalah Mobiles is a 2014 Malayalam romantic comedy film written and directed by debutant Sharath Haridas, Production controller Sanjay padiyoor starring Dulquer Salmaan, Nazriya Nazim, and Jacob Gregory. The film was produced by Anto Joseph Film Company and features music composed by Gopi Sunder. The film released on 24 January 2014, received negative reviews and performed poorly at the box office.

Plot
Afzal's mother Safiyumma is so worried about him. Once, when his uncle comes from Salalah, Oman, he tells him that he can get a job over there. Afzal rejects it saying 'working is slavery'. He tells that he want to set a mobile shop and needs fund for it. His uncle accepts it with one condition: that the shop should be named 'Salalah Mobiles'. Afzal appoints his childhood friend Binoy as his assistant. There was a bus stop in front of the shop and every morning a college going girl comes there. Afzal falls in love at first sight. He learns that her name is Shahana and his childhood classmate and enemy Manaf has a crush on her. After some days he goes to Coimbatore to get some stock. There he meets Azhagarsamy, a genius who has made many unbelievable applications. Afzal plans to purchase some of his apps. In the bar, when they were just talking Afzal calls Azhagarsamy a 'genius'. Azhagarsamy, who is so excited, gifts Afzal his mobile tapping app. Afzal returns to his place and there a virus spreads through messages and Afzal starts hearing every caller. Slowly, Manaf realizes this and, being jealous of Afzal, reveals to the police about Afzal's nature.

Cast

 Dulquer Salmaan as Afzal
 Nazriya Nazim as Shahana
 Santhanam as Azhagarsamy
 Jacob Gregory as Binoy
 Anwar Shereef as Abdul Manaf (Kozhi Manaf)
 Siddique as Ajay Chacko IPS
 Geetha as Safiyumma
 Narayanankutty as Ramachandran PC
 Tini Tom as Venu Maash
 Mamukkoya as Mammad
 Jose as Salauddeen
 S.P.Sreekumar as Hari, Afzal's friend
 Ramesh Pisharody as Shajahan
 Anju Sasi as a plus two student 
 Janardanan in a guest role as Kodaangi
 Raveendran in a guest role as Hawala dealer
 Nirmal Palazhi
 V. K. Sreeraman (Voice Character) as Shahana's estranged father 
 Kunjan as Munna

Production
Dulquer Salmaan was roped in to play the lead role. Many heroines were considered but Nazriya Nazim was finalized. Jacob Gregory who had acted alongside Dulquer in the film ABCD, was cast in a prominent role. Tamil comedian Santhanam was signed by the director to play a Tamilian, marking his Malayalam film debut. Sharath A. Haridaasan said that Santhanam plays a prominent role that manoeuvres the story to its turning point.

The shoot of the film began on 17 August 2013 at Kozhikode. The shooting locations were Kozhikode, Kodungaloor, Kottayam and Coimbatore.

Soundtrack

Box office
The film collected 3,196 from UK box office.

References

External links
 

2014 films
Indian romantic comedy films
Films set in Oman
Films shot in Kozhikode
Films shot in Thrissur
Films shot in Coimbatore
2010s Malayalam-language films
2014 romantic comedy films